Korean paper or hanji is the name of traditional handmade paper from Korea. Hanji is made from the inner bark of Broussonetia papyrifera known colloquially as paper mulberry, a tree native to Korea that grows well on its rocky mountainsides, known in Korean as dak. The formation aid crucial to making hanji is the mucilage that oozes from the roots of Hibiscus manihot. This substance helps suspend the individual fibers in water.

Traditional hanji is made in laminated sheets using the we bal method (a sheet formation technique), which allows for multi-directional grain The process of creating hanji also employs dochim, a method of pounding finished sheets to compact fibers and lessen ink bleed.

History

Ancient
In Korea, papermaking started not long after its birth in China. At first, made crudely out of hemp and ramie scraps (called maji). Its origins in Korea are believed to fall somewhere between the 3rd century and the end of the 6th century. In 1931, a piece of hanji was found at an archeological dig at a tomb site from the Lelang period (108 BCE–313 CE).

During the Three Kingdoms period (57 BCE–668 CE), each kingdom used paper to record their official histories. In 610, The Buddhist monk Damjing whom Goguryeo presented to Japan was able to make the production method of paper and ink. The world's oldest surviving wood block print is the Buddhist Dharani Sutra called the Pure Light Dharani Sutra (Revised Romanization: Mugujeonggwangdaedaranigyeong). Listed as Korea's National Treasure No. 126, it was printed onto hanji c. 704 and is still in good condition, bearing the papermaker's name. Paper crafts were also developed in the Three Kingdoms period, such as kites and other household items, and continued to flourish as hanji production increased. Silla Kingdom, one of the Three Kingdoms, settled the paper industry deeply into Korean culture, and called it Gyerimji, instead of Hanji (“Hanji’s History”).

Goryeo period

Hanji's golden age peaked in the Goryeo period (918–1392), which saw the rise in quality and use of hanji in conjunction with printmaking. Paper was used to make money, Buddhist texts, and medical and history books. The government encouraged dak cultivation and paper production, and dak was planted countrywide in the 12th century. Often called Goryeoji, hanji became famous in Asia for its strength and luster, and became a heavy trade item to China.

The Goryeo period is famous for two major landmarks in Korean printmaking and paper history. One was the carving of the Tripitaka Koreana onto over 80,000 wooden blocks, which contain no errors and are still extant in their original home at Haeinsa, a Buddhist temple in Gyeongsangnam-do. It was carved twice, due to its destruction by Mongol invasions in 1232; the final version was completed in 1251. The second accomplishment was the printing in 1377 of Jikji, a guide for students of Buddhism, and the world's oldest extant book printed using metal movable type. Printed onto hanji, it is housed today in the National Library of France, and displays proof of movable metal type well before Gutenberg's time.

Joseon period
The beginning of the Joseon period (1392–1910) saw continued flourishing of the hanji industry as paper permeated daily lives of Koreans through books, household items, and popular items such as fans and tobacco pouches. From the start of the Joseon period in an effort to promote austerity, artificial flowers that had been made from wax and silk were replaced by paper versions. Later, paper flowers were also used to replace other versions for Buddhist rites and festivals.

Variations of hanji became common, such as colored paper, and paper made from mixed fibers including pine bark, rice straw, and bamboo. This came partly from a need to find new materials beyond dak due to the huge demand for books. The government created an administrative agency devoted to paper production, and also supplied troops with paper armor, which was waterproof, a good insulator, and provided protection against arrows and swords. Oiled hanji was used to make greenhouses c. 1450 because the paper, made of natural materials, could control temperature, humidity, and light effectively. However, the Joseon government pressured Buddhist monks to increase their production of hanji that they were already making for Buddhist scriptures since the 15th century.

As the final blow to hanji, western methods of paper mass production were introduced in 1884.

After liberation
In the 1970s, the New Village Movement that aimed to modernize Korea rapidly also led to further decimation of the hanji industry, as it eradicated traditional straw-thatched homes that used hanji to cover floors, walls, ceilings, windows, and doors. The most recent threat to the Korean paper industry is the rise of inexpensive paper made in China, where labor costs and overhead are significantly lower than in Korea.

As of 2009, twenty-six hanji mills remain operational in South Korea. They make hanji for artists, calligraphers, conservators, temples, and laypeople.

Manufacturing process

Materials 
The two materials mainly used when making Hanji is the paper mulberry (called the Dak tree) and the aibika. More than 6 steps of the manufacturing process deal with mending and preparing these two materials (Seo).

The paper mulberry is a commonly grown plant in Asia, growing in the feet of mountains that gets a lot of sunlight, reaching a growth height of usually 3 meters. In Korean history, people used the fibers from these trees to make clothes, and they began to use it as the source for paper during the Goryeo dynasty. The Joseon dynasty, which came after Goryeo, recommended people to grow more of these mulberry trees.

The aibika usually finishes growing in October. Their roots contain a slimy mucus (called Dak Pul) which helps hold the paper together and give viscosity to the bark.

Process 
Ancient Koreans usually started making Hanji during the winter, because the mucus from Abelmoschus manihot became easily fermented due to the summer heat. Ancient Koreans believed that it was important to choose a good day with a nice sky to start making Hanji, and often gave religious rituals to the spirits in order to wish for a favorable condition and a smooth process.

The process of making Hanji differs by what ingredients the Hanji makers choose, and what methods of sheet formation they take to make the final product. However, the most traditional and basic process follows eight steps:

Hanji makers gather clean and strong barks of mulberry trees.
The bark is skinned and dried. The result is called Heukpi (흑피, hanja: 黑皮). The Heukpi is kept in flowing water for at least 10 hours. This eases the process of skinning the bark, turning Heukpi into Baekpi (백피, hanja: 白皮).
Bean or buckwheat stems are burned, and their ashes are put into water to boil the Baekpi for 4–5 hours.
The Baekpi is washed, removing any remaining bark and soil.
The skinned and cleaned Baekpi is placed on a flat stone board and pounded (Gohae) for about an hour.
The mucus from Abelmoschus manihot (Dakpul) is applied onto the bark. This helps the paper stay together for a long time, and does not contain any harmful chemicals.
Sheets of the mixture are formed next, while pouring more Dakpul onto the sheet. It is stirred with a long and wooden stick, and they call this Puldaejil.  The final substance is put on a flat bamboo outline, where the surface is made smooth and even. This process is where the skill of the craftsman is truly revealed, as it requires years of experience and practice to achieve good Hanji, determining the thickness, texture, and overall quality of Hanji. Many methods of this procedure exist, including Hullim, Gadum, Webal, and Jangpan, each producing slightly different types of Hanji. Traditional methods of sheet forming is different from the modern day method, which use machinery to make it even. 
One single sheet of Hanji is now made, which is pressed between heavy stones to dry, and placed in a warm room. They do not dry them near fire, because gradually drying them with a warm temperature causes the paper to be more tough and durable.

The overall process of making Hanji was very strenuous. One had to dedicate all of his or her life to making Hanji, and traditional Hanji makers would say “I will not let my son be a container man (the person who strains the fiber through a bamboo screen) even if I am driven to the worst”. It requires a lifelong practice to create perfect Hanji, and this is the reason why Hanji holds a great cultural value in Korea. These days, people use various technology to improve the process. For example, the Hanji makers use a heated stainless steel drum, brushing every part of the paper. This is the method that they take to dry the papers evenly, which is adapted from how traditional Hanji makers dried them on the floor of a warm room.

Characteristics of Hanji

Durability 
Hanji is a very reputable paper among Asians, and it is famous for its durability. The fact that other historical print papers have to be preserved in special containers when Hanji papers can still be displayed in museums proves this fact. The oldest text made of Hanji currently existing in Korea, Muggujungwang, is still well preserved after about 800 years.

Ventilation 
Hanji is a good ventilator, but it also acts as an insulator. Traditional Koreans covered their wooden doors with Hanji because it would cool down in the summer and make them warm during winter.

Waterproofness 
In March 2006, there was a lamp festival in Paris, France. Many sizes and colors of lamps were lighted in the Boulogne park. Soon after the festival started, there was a sudden rain, and people panicked. They were worried that all the lamps would turn off. However, lamps made out of traditional Hanji did not turn off. It did not let the rain through, protecting candle lights within, and it portrayed one of the many advantages of Hanji.

Scientific principles 
The bark from mulberry trees contain lignin and holocellulose, which contribute to the durability of Hanji. Ordinary paper has a pH level of 4~5.5, meaning that it is acidic. If paper has a low pH level (more acidic), it is completely decomposed in 100 years. Hanji, however, uses Hibiscus Manihot, which has a pH level of 7 and does not get dismantled easily.

Use of Hanji

Ancient uses 
Ever since paper was first introduced to the commoners in ancient Koreans, its uses have been adapted into various and unique ways. Hanji was used to help people in the daily lives. They covered their door frame with Hanji and controlled the room temperature. The high social class people, called Yangbans, recorded various documents on Hanji. This is one of the main reasons why Korea's ancient records are well preserved. It was one of the main export products that Korean dynasties used in trading (Seo). Another unique usage of Hanji is that people made armors out of Hanji. Even though Hanji is just a paper, it was very durable and tough. It was waterproof, and did not rip easily. There is a record in Korea saying that people made armors and suits with Hanji, and called them "Jigap".

Hanji art and craft forms 
There are two divisions of hanji art: two-dimensional and three-dimensional. Two-dimensional hanji art uses paper of various colors to create an image in a similar format as a painting. However, the paper itself is folded and crumpled to make the image stick up from the paper it is adhered to. People make various shapes with Hanji and frame it to exhibit on their wall. Three-dimensional hanji art is similar to paper mache, in that it can make sculptural objects that may stand unsupported. Traditional hanji craft forms include jiho, jido, and jiseung. Jiho is a method that uses hanji scraps soaked in water and then added to glue, making a clay-like paste that can be molded into lidded bowls. Jido is the craft of pasting many layers of hanji onto a pre-made frame, which can be made into sewing baskets and trunks. Ancient Koreans commonly put their sewing materials in small boxes decorated with colorful Hanji ("Hanji Crafting"). Jiseung is a method of cording and weaving strips of hanji to make a wide array of household goods, including trays, baskets, mats, quivers, shoes, washbasins, and chamberpots. Other than these, Hanji was made into various flowers to decorate Buddhist temples ("Hanji Crafting").

Gallery

See also
Important Intangible Cultural Properties of Korea
History of typography in East Asia

Citations 
Cleaning the Bark. Doopedia. Web. 10 March 2016.

"Hanji Crafting." Naver Encyclopedia (Doopedia). Naver, n.d. Web. 17 Mar. 2016.

"Hanji's History." Museum Hanji. Gwasan Hanji Museum, n.d. Web. 7 Mar. 2016.

"Jigap." Naver Encyclopedia (Doopedia). Naver, n.d. Web. 17 Mar. 2016.

Lee, Aimee. Hanji Unfurled: One Journey into Korean Papermaking. Ann Arbor, Mich: The Legacy Press, 2012.

Mulberry Tree. Doopedia. Web. 10 March 2016.

"Paper Mulberry." Naver Encyclopedia (Doopedia). Naver, n.d. Web. 13 Mar. 2016.

Seo, Jungho. How to Preserve Cultural Properties. Seoul: Kyungin Publishing, 2008. Print.

Song, Minah, and Jesse Munn. "Permanence, Durability and Unique Properties of Hanji." FIDES  International. FIDES International. Web. 2 Mar. 2016.

"Sunset Hibiscus." Naver Encyclopedia (Doopedia). Naver, n.d. Web. 16 Mar. 2016.

"The Significance of Hanji." Naver Encyclopedia (Doopedia). Naver, n.d. Web. 14 Mar. 2016.

"The Story of Hanji." Visit Korea. Korean Tour Organization (KTO), n.d. Web. 6 Mar. 2016.

References

Further reading

External links

Hanji (Traditional Korean paper) at Korea Tourism Organization
Fabulous Hanji (Korean Traditional Paper) at Korea Tourism Organization
Traditional Culture Hands-on Programs at Korea Tourism Organization

 Korean paper
Paper
Paper
Paper art
Papermaking